Marek Černovský (born 28 October 1994 in Prague) is a Czech curler.

At the national level, he is a four-time Czech men's champion curler (2019, 2020, 2022 and 2023) and two-time Czech mixed champion curler (2018, 2019).

Teams

Men's

Mixed

Mixed doubles

Personal life
He started curling in 2004 at the age of 10.

References

External links

Living people
1994 births
Sportspeople from Prague
Czech male curlers
Czech curling champions
Competitors at the 2017 Winter Universiade
Competitors at the 2019 Winter Universiade
Curlers at the 2012 Winter Youth Olympics
21st-century Czech people